Artificial Intelligence is a compilation album released via Warp on 6 July 1992. It is the first release in Warp's Artificial Intelligence series. The album helped birth the genre that would later become known as intelligent dance music.

Background
According to Warp co-founder Steve Beckett, the album was primarily intended for sedentary listening rather than dancing, and this was reflected in the album art, which depicts an android asleep in an armchair with Kraftwerk and Pink Floyd albums at its side:

Critical reception

Critic Simon Reynolds cited Artificial Intelligence as a key ambient techno release in a 1994 write-up for The New York Times.

In a retrospective review for AllMusic, critic John Bush praised Artificial Intelligence as "a superb collection of electronic listening music." In 2014, Daniel Montesinos-Donaghy of Vice described it as "an exercise in re-training the ear." The following year, Tegan O'Neil of The A.V. Club wrote: "Although every producer on it would go on to have a long and storied career, the album's music is satisfying enough on its own terms."

In 2014, Rolling Stone included Artificial Intelligence on its list of "The 40 Most Groundbreaking Albums of All Time", citing its formative role in the development of intelligent dance music (IDM). According to The Guardians Ben Cardew, the album "birthed" the IDM genre and "changed the idea of electronic music as merely a tool for dancing". In 2017, Pitchfork placed it at number 10 on its list of "The 50 Best IDM Albums of All Time".

Track listing

References

External links
 
 
 Artificial Intelligence at Warp

1992 compilation albums
Warp (record label) compilation albums
Record label compilation albums
Electronic compilation albums
Intelligent dance music compilation albums